Xandria Ooi is a Malaysian writer, television and radio host, and motivational speaker.

Writing
Xandria's first book, Love, Work and Everything in Between was published in early 2009. Xandria started writing for The Star Publications at the age of 16 under BRATs, a young journalistic program.  At the age of 19, Xandria contributed to the column 'The Tale of Two Cities' whilst studying in Melbourne.  Xandria wrote for the Metro section of The Star newspaper for 12 years, from the “Tale of Two Cities” to “Watchamacallit” which then became “Sights & Sounds.”

Television
Xandria began her television hosting career with Astro's HITZ.TV Channel, after winning their UVJ Search contest in 2005. She then moved onto Ntv7's Life Session, which she hosted live every week. She started her own production company, 'XO Productions' and the first production was 'Xandria's Weekend Discovery', broadcast on NTV7. She produced and hosted Discover Perak Season One in 2011 and Season Two in 2014, both aired on the Asian Food Channel.

Fashion
In 2009, Xandria, together with fashion designer Sonny San for his label Eclipse, designed a capsule collection for their Fall-Winter 2009 campaign. The collection, called 'Xandria Ooi for Eclipse', consisted of outfits that were convertible so each item could be worn in various ways.

References

External links
 Official website

1983 births
Living people
People from Kuala Lumpur
Malaysian people of Chinese descent
Malaysian writers
Malaysian television personalities
English-language writers from Malaysia